Legal successor may refer to:

Legal successor (business), a successor company legally recognized as such
Legal successor (organization), a successor organization legally declared or recognized as such
Legal successor (property), a legal inheritor of a property or property rights 
A state that inherited territory and population of another, see succession of states.

See also
Successor (disambiguation)
Succession (disambiguation)
Order of succession
:Category:Succession acts